Echeveria strictiflora, the desert savior, is a species of flowering plant in the family Crassulaceae, native to southwestern Texas and to the Chihuahuan Desert of northeast Mexico. Its range consists of several scattered populations, rather than a contiguous range.

Description
Rosettes of this succulent perennial can reach up to 10 cm in diameter, but are usually smaller.

Leaves: Range in color from glaucous to brownish green or green, and some Mexican populations of the plant have red leaf margins.

Inflorescences: Reaching 20–25 cm in heigh, with flowers in shades of pink or orange.

Cultivation
Benefits from scant water during the cooler winter months and higher levels of water during the warmer growing season.

Etymology
Echeveria is named for Atanasio Echeverría y Godoy, a botanical illustrator who contributed to Flora Mexicana.

Strictiflora means '[having or bearing] straight flowers'. It is derived from strict, meaning 'straight' and flora meaning 'flower'.

References

Flora of Texas
strictiflora